Bull Shoals Lake is an artificial lake or reservoir in the Ozark Mountains of northern Arkansas and southern Missouri. It has hundreds of miles of lake arms and coves, and common activities include boating, water sports, swimming, and fishing. Nineteen developed parks around the shoreline provide campgrounds, boat launches, swim areas, and marinas.

History 

Bull Shoals Dam was created to impound the White River by one of the largest concrete dams in the United States and the 5th largest dam in the world at its inception. Work on the dam began in 1947, was completed in 1951 and dedicated by President Harry S. Truman in 1952. At least seven small family cemeteries and 20 larger cemeteries were meticulously relocated to accommodate the new lake.
Recent national events include Brostock 2010 and 2011 and the TBF Bass Federation and Bassmaster Elite Series Tournaments in 2012.

Hydrology 
Bull Shoals Lake impounds the White River for the last time as water travels toward its mouth on the Mississippi River. Bull Shoals is thus the lake farthest downstream in a chain of four artificial lakes that include (from upstream to downstream) Beaver Lake, Table Rock Lake and Lake Taneycomo. The lake is controlled by the Army Corps of Engineers and has the primary purpose of flood control.  The level of the lake fluctuates regularly with a normal pool level elevation of 654 feet above sea level, which is locally known as powerpool.  However, the lake regularly fluctuates between an elevation of 630 to 680 feet. The upper part of the lake, below nearby Powersite Dam, is known as the "Pothole".

The shoreline of the lake is totally undeveloped and protected by a buffer zone (locally called the “take line”) owned, operated, managed, and controlled by the Army Corps of Engineers. The dam is designed for a maximum elevation of 695 feet (top of the flood pool). Bull Shoals Lake covers 45,000 acres (182 km²) with a 700-mile (1,120-km) shoreline at powerpool to more than 70,000 acres (284 km²)with a 1,000-mile (1,600-km) shoreline at 690 feet. The bottom of the lake consists of bedrock with very limited vegetation. The shoreline is heavily forested.

State park 

The Bull Shoals-White River State Park is a 725-acre (2.9 km²) park in Baxter and Marion Counties of Arkansas both above and below the massive dam. Facilities, including camping, pavilions, dock and interpretive programs, stretch along the banks of the White River.  Along the lakeshore, the park offers picnic sites and playgrounds.

Flooding of 2008
In the spring of 2008, due to the record rainfall, Bull Shoals reached its highest water level since 1957.  The lake crested at 695.02 feet above sea level, prompting the Army Corps of Engineers to open the floodgates to relieve the lake from further flooding.  A record crest of 696.51 was achieved at 5 p.m. Friday May 27, 2011 due to record rainfall, exceeding the Spring 2008 lake levels and 1957 levels.

See also 
List of Arkansas dams and reservoirs

References

External links 

 Bull Shoals Lake / White River Chamber of Commerce
 Bull Shoals Dam Web Cam
 Bull Shoals Background History
 

Lakes of the U.S. Interior Highlands
Ozarks
Protected areas of Baxter County, Arkansas
Protected areas of Boone County, Arkansas
Protected areas of Marion County, Arkansas
Protected areas of Ozark County, Missouri
Buildings and structures in Ozark County, Missouri
Tourist attractions in Baxter County, Arkansas
Tourist attractions in Boone County, Arkansas
Tourist attractions in Marion County, Arkansas
Reservoirs in Missouri
Reservoirs in Arkansas
Buildings and structures in Taney County, Missouri
Protected areas of Taney County, Missouri
White River (Arkansas–Missouri)
Buildings and structures in Baxter County, Arkansas
Buildings and structures in Boone County, Arkansas
Buildings and structures in Marion County, Arkansas
Bodies of water of the Ozarks
Bodies of water of Taney County, Missouri
Bodies of water of Baxter County, Arkansas
Bodies of water of Boone County, Arkansas
Bodies of water of Marion County, Arkansas
Bodies of water of Ozark County, Missouri